Diamond Lake may refer to:

U.S. geographical locations
Diamond Lake (Cass County, Michigan), Cass County, Michigan
Diamond Lake (Kandiyohi County, Minnesota)
Diamond Lake, Minneapolis, a neighborhood in Minneapolis and its namesake lake
Diamond Lake (Oregon), a lake in the southern part of Oregon
Diamond Lake Township, Minnesota, a township in Lincoln County
Diamond Lake (Idaho), a glacial lake in Elmore County, Idaho
Diamond Lake (Illinois), a lake, neighborhood and school district in Mundelein
Diamond Lake (South Dakota), a lake
Diamond Lake, Washington, and unincorporated community located in Pend Oreille County, Washington
Various lakes without articles: see List of lakes named Diamond

Other geographical locations
Diamond Lake (Ontario), Canada
At least three lakes in New Zealand: see List of lakes of New Zealand

In fiction
Diamond Lake (Greyhawk), a fictional mining town, on a lake of the same name, in the Dungeons and Dragons World of Greyhawk

See also
Diamond Valley Lake, a reservoir in Southern California